Lake Marshall is a lake in Lyon County, in the U.S. state of Minnesota.

Lake Marshall was named for William Rainey Marshall, 5th Governor of Minnesota.

See also
List of lakes in Minnesota

References

Lakes of Minnesota
Lakes of Lyon County, Minnesota